Henry David may refer to:

 Henry David Abraham (born 1942), American physician
 Henry David Aiken (1912–1982), American philosopher
 Henry David Hurst (1916–2003), American classicist and historian
 Henry David Inglis (1795–1835), Scottish travel writer
 Henry David Leslie (1822–1896), English composer and conductor
 Henry David Thoreau (1817–1862), American essayist, poet, and philosopher

See also:
 Henry Davids